There have been a number of CDs released featuring soundtracks from the television series Lost in Space.

Lost in Space Vol. 1
GNP Crescendo released the first album in 1997 as part of The Fantasy Worlds of Irwin Allen, featuring music from "The Reluctant Stowaway" (tracks 2–5), "Island in the Sky" (tracks 6 and 7) and "The Hungry Sea" (tracks 8–10).

All music composed by John Williams.

 Lost in Space Main Title (:56)
 Smith's Evening/Judo Chop/On the Pad/Countdown (8:54)
 Escape Velocity/Robot Control/Meteor Storm/Defrosting (7:58)
 The Weightless Waltz (2:30)
 The Monster Rebels/A Walk in Space/Finale (7:49)
 Suiting Up/Stranglehold/The Landing/Search for John (12:20)
 Tractor Play-on/Electric Sagebrush/Will Is Threatened (2:30)
 The Earthquake (2:44)
 Chariot Titles/Fahrenheit a Go-Go/The Chariot Continues/Sunstorm (3:41)
 Morning After/The Inland Sea/Land Ho/Strange Visitor (7:54)
 Lost in Space End Title (:50)

Lost in Space Vol. 2
GNP Crescendo released the second album in 1997 as part of the abovementioned set, featuring music from "Wild Adventure" (tracks 2–4), "The Haunted Lighthouse" (tracks 5 and 6), and "The Great Vegetable Rebellion" (tracks 7 and 8).

Tracks in bold contain themes composed by John Williams.

 Lost in Space Main Title: Season 3 – John Williams (1:03)
 Million Miles/Dust Ball/Episode Titles – Alexander Courage (2:36)
 Pushy Fellow – Alexander Courage (2:40)
 Flying "A" Statin/Floating Lady/The Big Whew/Irwin Van Belt – Alexander Courage (8:48)
 Opening Scene/J-5/Take-Off/F-12/Colonel Fogey/Penny And J-5/A Zaybo For Smith/Turkey Dinner/Act-Out on J-5 – Joseph Mullendore (10:30)
 J-5 Listens to Penny/J-5 to the Rescue/Last Scene – Joseph Mullendore (4:22)
 A Plant Planet – Alexander Courage (2:39)
 Episode Titles/Howling Hyacinths/The Vegetable/Sprouting Smith/Vic's Smithy/Judy's Goat/The Dry Boys/Caught by a Carrot – Alexander Courage (11:43)
 Lost in Space End Title: Season 3 – John Williams (:51)

Lost in Space Vol. 3
GNP Crescendo released the third album in 2000, featuring music from "The Derelict" by Richard LaSalle, Herman Stein and Hans J. Salter (tracks 1 and 3–11) and "My Friend Mr. Nobody" by John Williams (tracks 12–17).

Single-asterisked cues by Richard LaSalle. **by Herman Stein. ***by Hans J. Salter.

Tracks in bold contain themes composed by John Williams.

 Rescued From Space*/The Comet Cometh** (8:36)
 Lost in Space Main Title: Season 1 – John Williams (:58)
 Derelict Title**/Don Rescues John and Maureen* (5:30)
 The Robot Performs* (1:19)
 Writing In The Log*/Family** (1:58)
 The Treatment*/Swallowed** (4:18)
 Flashing Lights***/Frontal Robotomy*** (:39)
 Filmy Spider Web***/Crystalline Power Source*** (3:30)
 Smart Kid***/Bubble Monster* (5:30)
 Lift Off*** (4:21)
 New Planet*/Continued Next Week** (01:34)
 Wonderland Discovery (2:58)
 Hairstyle Book/Penny's Friend/Diamonds/Penny/Diamond Play Off (4:13)
 Penny's Cave/To The Cave/Gathering Wild Flowers/Moving Rocks (5:44)
 Mother & Daughter/Penny's Problem (5:54)
 Storm Coming Up/A New Galaxy (3:57)
 Lost in Space End Credits: Season 1 – John Williams (:53)
 Lost in Space Unused 2nd Season Main Title – Warren Barker (:48)

Lost in Space 40th Anniversary Edition
In 2005 La-La Land Records released a two-disc set covering many of the series' composers. Cues in bold are previously unreleased.

Disc 1: "The Reluctant Stowaway" (tracks 2–7), "Island In The Sky" (tracks 8–15), "The Hungry Sea" (tracks 16–19) and "My Friend Mr. Nobody" (tracks 20–21); all music by John Williams. Although all four episodes were represented on the previous albums, not all of the music is replicated here.

 Lost in Space Season 1 Main Title (:53)
 Smith's Entrance (2:45)
 Final Countdown (4:33)
 Escape Velocity/Meteor Storm (5:41)
 Weightless Waltz (3:37)
 Monster Rebels (3:40)
 Walk In Space/To Be Continued (7:35)
 Strange Planet/John's Descent (1:30)
 Helmet It (1:19)
 Strangle Hold/Landing (6:24)
 Lil’ Will And The Robot (1:29)
 Search For John (4:13)
 Monkey's Doo (4:52)
 Operation Rescue (1:16)
 Personal Chauffeur/Electric Sagebrush/Will Is Threatened (2:34)
 Earthquake (2:45)
 Temperature Rising/Boring Company/Don's Rays (4:08)
 Warming Rays/Sun Storm (3:00)
 Land Ho/Kid's Play-Off (2:36)
 Wonderland Discovery/Penny's Problem/Gathering Wild Flowers (9:33)
 New Galaxy (2:26)
 Lost in Space Season 1 End Title (:50)

Disc 2

 "CBS Presents This Special Program In Color" (:08)
 Lost in Space Season 3 Main Title – John Williams (1:02)
 "The Derelict": Derelict Title (Herman Stein)/Frontal Robotomy (Hans J. Salter)/Family (Herman Stein)(2:00)
 "There Were Giants In The Earth": Microscope/Pod Almighty – Herman Stein (1:49)
 "Welcome Stranger": Stranger/Friend Or Foe/Permission/Spore Sprayer/The Robinsons/Upper-Ration/Hapgood/Star Charts (Frank Comstock)/Tall Tail/Blast Off (Frank Comstock) – Herman Stein except where indicated (17:33)
 Lost in Space Season 3 Bumper – John Williams (:05)
 "Blast Off Into Space": The Family/Quake/Mine Entrance/Galaxies Wins/Spilled Cosmonium/It's Alive/Cosmonium Fiend/One Last Check/Family/Blast Off/Thruster Control Short/Thruster Control Continued/Freeze Frame – Leith Stevens (15:58)
 "The Curse Of Cousin Smith": Mississippi Shuffle – Robert Drasnin (1:28)
 "The Curse Of Cousin Smith": Little Joe's Yes – Robert Drasnin (1:22)
 "Girl From The Green Dimension": Mulberry Bush/What A Knight – Alexander Courage (4:26)
 "Cave Of The Wizards": Mummy's Boy/Draconian Anthem/King Queen – Alexander Courage (5:16)
 "Collision Of Planets": The Aliens/Sampson March/1st Blast – Gerald Fried (3:27)
 "The Promised Planet": Space-A-Delic – Pete Rugolo (3:50)
 Senior – from "The Sky Pirate" (Leigh Harline)/Introduction – from "Ghost In Space" (Leigh Harline)/The Search – from "The Sky Pirate" (Lionel Newman) (3:58)
 "The Sky Pirate": A Nice Little Bank/Investigation (Cyril Mockridge) (2:52)
 "Space Circus": Terror Stinger/Another World/Ominous Signs/Awful Monster/Silly Monster – Fred Steiner (8:02)
 "Forbidden World": Space Walk – Robert Drasnin (:39)
 Lost in Space Season 2 Main Title (unused) – Warren Barker (:58)
 Lost in Space Season 3 End Title – John Williams (1:09)

"Space-A-Delic" was previously released as part of the bonus CD in the box set The Fantasy Worlds Of Irwin Allen.

Lost in Space: 50th Anniversary Soundtrack Collection
In 2015 La-La Land Records issued a 12-disc boxed set of music from the series, featuring all the episode scores and the tracked-in music for the unaired pilot "No Place To Hide" (which used music by Bernard Herrmann, Leigh Harline and Lionel Newman).

References

External links 
 

Film and television discographies
Lost in Space